Deadlift world records are the international records in deadlift across the years, regardless of weight class or governing organization.

Progression

Powerlifting

All-time

IPF (equipped)

Strongman

Chart

See also 
 Progression of the bench press world record
 World record progression women's weightlifting
 World record progression men's weightlifting

Notes

References

Powerlifting
Deadlift